The 1972–73 season was Motherwell's 4th consecutive season in the top division of Scottish football after being promoted from the Scottish Second Division in 1969.

Results
All results are written with Motherwell's score first.

Scottish League Division One

Scottish Cup

Scottish League Cup

Texaco Cup

League table

See also
 List of Motherwell F.C. seasons

References

Motherwell F.C. seasons
Motherwell